Jonathan Hay (born December 16, 1975) is an American publicist and record producer. His music career started in the 1990s when he stumbled upon a recording studio while attending college in Louisville, Kentucky. Hay is most known for his work with "Pon de Replay", the debut single from Rihanna. He has produced six albums and a single that topped the Billboard charts in multiple genres including hip hop and jazz. Hay's Follow the Leader (Reimagined As Jazz), a collaboration album with Eric B. & Rakim ended Michael Bublé's 38 week reign at the top of the Billboard charts and remained for 11 consecutive weeks.

Publicist career

Starting out in the music business as a publicist, Jonathan Hay worked with established recording artists and record labels alike. His first professional project was with Quo, the short lived hip-hip duo that was signed to Michael Jackson's MJJ Productions. Hay's first success was achieved with Days of the New, the multi-platinum rock band who had four hit singles; most notably "Touch, Peel and Stand" that Billboard awarded "All-Time Greatest Mainstream Rock Song". In 2003, Travis Meeks, the lead singer of the group slammed the publicist for making unauthorized and premature disclosures, which the musician felt "actually damaged his chances" to advance his career. Hay worked for Whitney Houston through her father's John Houston Entertainment company. In 2005, Hay tried to promote Rihanna's debut single by "fabricat[ing] stories of Rihanna and Jay Z, leaking false rumors to tabloids, working with Internet message boards, etc." Hay worked as a publicist for Suge Knight's Death Row Records and announced its catalog was being sold to Hasbro. In 2012, Hay was part of a guardianship case involving teen actress Ariel Winter, a star on the TV series Modern Family, and her mother, Chrisoula "Crystal" Workman. Hay testified and signed a declaration for Ariel Winter in favor of her staying with her sister Shanelle Workman Gray.

On October 23, 2015, Hay appeared on Inside Edition and publicly apologized to Beyoncé for his part in the unauthorized biography Becoming Beyoncé. Hay is a subject in the book for a publicity stunt in 2005 for spreading rumors that Jay Z was dating Rihanna to boost the then 17-year-old's "Pon De Replay". Hay confessed that he started those rumors during a difficult time. "The PR stunt that I did was out of desperation to help break 'Pon de Replay,'" Hay said. "It was reckless and I didn't think it was going to work. I was just throwing spaghetti at the wall to see what would stick." Neither Rihanna or Jay Z was aware of his machinations Hay told Newsday. As he noted during an interview with HipHopDX:

In December, Hay was in both Vogue and Vanity Fair for a recording project in Florida. Hay spoke out in Rolling Stone magazine [March 24, 2016 (Issue 1257)] to publicly support Kesha during her sexual assault lawsuit against Dr. Luke.  The magazine called Hay a "crisis management expert". 
Hay told The Sun that his frequent collaborator Cyhi The Prynce wrote the lyrics to "Famous", the song that caused the public battle between Taylor Swift, Kanye West and Kim Kardashian. According to Hollywood Life, a source close to West said, "Cyhi is a creative contributor on the song, in which he has been credited accordingly. However, the specific Taylor lyrics were written by Kanye himself."

Hay had involvement with the Drake and Sophie Brussaux pregnancy scandal. He told People Magazine 
"I've seen the text messages and they do exist" in reference to conversations purportedly from Drake, urging Brussaux to undergo an abortion. Hay has spoken out about this situation with Perez Hilton, Glamour Magazine (in the Netherlands), Hollywood Life and Public Magazine (in France). Hay spoke about the Kathy Griffin and Donald Trump photo scandal to The Huffington Post calling her press conference "flat-out gross". He explained, "From a PR perspective, she did do the right thing, by apologizing … but still that isn't enough. Not even close." From the viewpoint of a crisis publicist, Hay was quoted in The New York Times about XXXTentacion's posthumous album release Skin.

After being a publicist for over two decades, Hay started producing music full-time.

Production career

Jonathan Hay's first notable collaboration was Prince and Audio Stepchild's "When Will We Be Paid", a cover song originally performed by The Staple Singers. The song was released through Prince's independent label NPG Records in April 2001 as part of a four-song extended play that peaked at No. 59 on the US Charts.

Hip-Hop and Rap Releases (2013-2018):

Hay co-founded SMH Records with Mike Smith a Charlotte, North Carolina based record label. Hay and Smith got into a public dispute with Kanye West and Kim Kardashian over the song "These Walls Revisted" and a charity auction of an original painting of West. On June 20, 2013, Kardashian West's attorney issued a cease and desist. Hay was executive producer and one of several musical producers on Sex, Money and Hip-Hop by Crooked I of Shady Records group Slaughterhouse. Hay executive produced an album featuring Kentucky artists and film star Johnny Depp. Depp also appeared on the SMH Records album Fear of a Pink Planet by Pink Grenade, released in July 2014, containing 18 hip-hop songs written by Hay.

Hay was a music producer on the TV show "One Shot" with T.I., RZA, DJ Khaled, Tech N9ne, Sway Calloway and others. The show debuted on BET on August 23, 2016. Hay, Smith and King Tech (Sway & Tech) released When Music Worlds Collide that features many popular rap artists from several different eras. It was released as a streaming-only album with a "Spotify vs. TIDAL" challenge, receiving national coverage on Fox News, Billboard, and Business Insider.  Hay produced "Don't Close Your Eyes (Ashamed)", a song about suicide and alcohol abuse as a tribute to the late Keith Whitley released on what would have been his 60th birthday. The video for "Don't Close Your Eyes (Ashamed)" premiered on MTV News. Hay and Kxng Crooked produced "Too Ashamed", a sequel song to "Don't Close Your Eyes (Ashamed)" and explained to Billboard Magazine that "working on 'Too Ashamed' was a very emotional recording experience for everyone involved."

In June 2016, Hay produced a single for Snoop Dogg's relaunched record label Doggy Style Records. In August, Hay took a stand against Afrika Bambaataa with a remix featuring Ron "Bee Stinger" Savage. In the diss track, Jonathan replays the notes from Bambaataa's song "Planet Rock" while Savage speaks out about child molestation In September, Hay released albums with Kxng Crooked and Cyhi The Prynce that didn't chart. In April 2017, Hay was a producer on a viral song about reality television personality Kylie Jenner that debuted on TMZ. In November, Hay collaborated with both Conway The Machine and Riff Raff. In December, Hay produced singles with Kxng Crooked and Twista. In February 2018, Hay produced another song for Riff Raff. In May The Whoodlum Ball with DJ Whoo Kid was released and it hit multiple Billboard Charts including #1 on the Billboard Heatseekers, #9 Rap Albums and #11 Independent. On September 15, Smith and Hay peaked at No. 14 on the Billboard Charts (and #5 Billboard Christian Streaming Chart) with the single "Beautiful Day" featuring Bubba Sparxxx. Hay was one of the producers of Juicy J's moderate hit "Don't You Wanna".

Jazz Releases (2018-2019):

Hay produced three consecutive #1 Billboard Jazz Albums. In January 2018, Hay's jazz debut release Jazz (Deluxe) hit #1 on the Billboard Jazz Charts.  In July 2019 Jazz Part Two was released and hit #1 on the Billboard Contemporary Jazz Charts. On July 26, Hay released Follow the Leader, a cover of Eric B. & Rakim's album in the style of jazz with Benny Reid that hit #1 on the Billboard Jazz Charts and was up for Grammy consideration. Peaking at No. 1, the album remained on the Billboard Charts for 11 weeks. In an interview with Billboard, Hay said:

 

The deluxe version of the album was released with Eric B. & Rakim by Fat Beats on December 13, 2019, that included physical formats of vinyl, cd and cassettes. Eric B. & Rakim spoke about the Follow the Leader Re-Imagined as Jazz and were quoted as saying:

House Music and EDM Releases (2020-2022):

Inspired by the business model of Elrow Music, Jonathan Hay started the electronic music labels RUSH Music and Tech Row Records. JT Barnett, who helped create 'Joe Exotic The Tiger King' filmed a documentary about Hay's career in house music. Hay co-produced "Big Poppa (House Mix)" with Christopher "C.J." Wallace Jr. from Ready to Dance, an album containing re-imagined dance renditions of songs from The Notorious B.I.G. The single landed at #76 on the iTunes Charts. Spin Magazine called the single "electrifying". Rolling Stone Magazine published Hay's statement to Perez Hilton about the song:

 

Hay produced Come As You Are: Nirvana Reimagined as House and Techno supporting LGBTQ+, mental health and suicide awareness. Come As You Are has collaborations with Fishbone bassist John Norwood Fisher, GRAMMY-winning trumpeter Maurice Brown, Pink Floyd saxophonist Scott Page, J Patt of The Knocks and drummer Andy Kravitz. The vinyl record and compact disc edition of Nirvana Reimagined released on October 7th 2022.

A writer for the GRAMMY's stated:

 

Hay and TECHROW released a house music reimagination of "Hit 'Em Up" featuring Tupac Shakur with jazz elements. Suge Jacob Knight, son of Death Row Records founder Marion "Suge" Knight publicly supported the single. Hay released an electronic cover version of Ariana Grande's song Pete Davidson.

Personal life

The media reported that Jonathan Hay and Adele were romantically involved after meeting in a recording studio in New York. Adele and Hay declined to comment on the dating speculation. Hay is a Leesburg, Florida native. He went to Waggener High School but switched to a private school system to play basketball at Christian Academy of Louisville. He was adopted as a child by Donald and Nancy Stivers. With the help of 23andMe, he met his biological Mom named Pamela Nicely Rappe for the first time in February 2017. She died unexpectedly in February 2021.

On April 20, 2017, Hay and his teenage daughter Iliana Eve were victims of a home invasion and were held at gunpoint and duct-taped. Hay told the New York Daily News:

 The suspect was arrested and charged with first degree robbery, two counts of kidnapping, possession of a handgun by a convicted felon, receiving stolen property, possession of drug paraphernalia and two counts fraudulent use of a credit card. WHAS-TV reported that St. Matthews Police arrested two suspects and a third was indicted on kidnapping and robbery charges.

With the help of Ranna Royce, Hay channeled that trauma into his chart topping Jazz (Deluxe) and Jazz Part Two releases. In an interview he said, "We were coming back to my place, and when we were coming up to the door, we were attacked from behind," he recalls. "We didn't even see him coming. And next thing you know, we're thrown into my house, duct taped, he had a mask on … it was traumatic. We had guns all over us, the whole time we thought we were gonna die." "All the songs come from that place," Hay explains.

He is an advocate for marijuana and its potential to treat PTSD. According to Forbes, marijuana helped him cope with the emotional impact of the home invasion.

References

American adoptees
People from Leesburg, Florida
Musicians from Louisville, Kentucky
1975 births
Living people
Record producers from Florida